The Independent Left Party (FBP) was a political party in Hungary during the 1930s.

History
The party first contested national elections in 1931, winning a single seat in the parliamentary elections that year. It did not contest any further elections.

References

Defunct political parties in Hungary
Political parties with year of establishment missing
Political parties with year of disestablishment missing